The 2011 GT4 European Cup season was the fifth season of the GT4 European Cup. It began on 23 April at Zandvoort, and was scheduled to finish at the same venue on 16 October after eighteen races held at six meetings.

Entry list

Race calendar and results

References

External links
 Official Website of the GT4 European Cup

GT4 European Series
GT4 European Cup
GT4 European Cup